Brittany Baker (born April 23, 1991) is an American professional wrestler and dentist. She is signed to All Elite Wrestling (AEW), where she performs under the ring name Britt Baker where she is a former AEW Women's World Champion. Born in Punxsutawney, Pennsylvania, Baker made her debut as a professional wrestler in 2015 and attended the University of Pittsburgh School of Dental Medicine from 2014 to 2018. The following year, she became the first woman signed to AEW.

Early life
Brittany Baker was born on April 23, 1991, in Punxsutawney, Pennsylvania. She studied behavioral medicine with a minor in human development and family studies at Pennsylvania State University. She began her professional wrestling training in June 2014, when she enrolled in the International Wrestling Cartel training academy in South Hills, Pennsylvania, training under the tutelage of Super Hentai and Marshall Gambino. That same year, Baker enrolled in the University of Pittsburgh School of Dental Medicine, graduating in May 2018. While studying dentistry, she trained in Absolute Intense Wrestling in Cleveland, Ohio, under Johnny Gargano and Candice LeRae.

Professional wrestling career

Early career (2015–2018)

Baker made her professional wrestling debut at an International Wrestling Cartel (IWC) event in 2015. She appeared on WWE Raw as a jobber in 2016, losing to Nia Jax in a squash match. On December 10, 2016, she became the inaugural IWC Women's Champion when she defeated April Sera, Marti Belle, and Sonya Strong in a four-way elimination match. She was defeated by LuFisto for the title in July 2017. On September 1, 2018, Baker competed in a four corner survival match against Madison Rayne, Chelsea Green, and Tessa Blanchard at the All In pay-per-view event, which was won by Blanchard. She regained the IWC Women's Championship by defeating LuFisto and Ray Lyn in a three-way match in October, only to drop it again in November to Katie Arquette.

All Elite Wrestling (2019–present)
On January 2, 2019, it was reported that Baker had signed with newfound promotion All Elite Wrestling (AEW), being the company's first contracted female wrestler. She made her debut for the promotion on May 25 at its inaugural pay-per-view, Double or Nothing, where she defeated Nyla Rose, Kylie Rae, and Awesome Kong in a four-way match. On July 13, she competed in a tag team match alongside Riho at Fight for the Fallen, where the two were defeated by Bea Priestley and Shoko Nakajima. Baker suffered a legitimate concussion due to a kick by Priestley during the match, which incited a storyline rivalry between the two. On August 31, Baker competed in the Women's Casino Battle Royale for an opportunity at the AEW Women's World Championship at the All Out pre-show, during which she eliminated Shazza McKenzie, ODB, Brandi Rhodes, Mercedes Martinez, and Priestley before she herself was eliminated by Rose. Baker went on to defeat Priestley in singles competition at the Full Gear pre-show on November 9.

At Chris Jericho's Rock 'N' Wrestling Rager at Sea Part Deux: Second Wave, which aired on Dynamite on January 22, 2020, Baker turned heel after she berated commentator Tony Schiavone following her victory over Priscilla Kelly. In May, Baker injured her leg during a tag team match, in which she and Rose went on to defeat Hikaru Shida and Kris Statlander, later stating that she would return in a wrestling role in September at All Out. Baker then began a rivalry with Big Swole, which involved Swole abducting her and tossing her into a dumpster during an episode of Dynamite. In July, she underwent surgery on her nose to repair a deviated septum. At All Out, Baker lost to Big Swole in a Tooth and Nail match, which was taped at her dental office. In November 2020, Baker began a feud with Thunder Rosa. The two competed against each other at Beach Break in February 2021, where Baker was victorious. That same month, she participated in the AEW Women's World Championship Eliminator Tournament as part of the U.S. bracket, defeating Madi Wrenkowski in the first round but losing to Rose in the semifinals. The feud concluded on the March 17 episode of Dynamite in the program's first main event to feature women, during which Rosa defeated Baker in an unsanctioned Lights Out match. The match received praise from critics.

At Double or Nothing on May 30, Baker defeated Shida to win the AEW Women's World Championship for the first time. On the premiere episode of Rampage on August 13, Baker held on to the title by defeating Red Velvet, after which she introduced Jamie Hayter as her ally. Baker successfully defended her title for the fifth time when she defeated Tay Conti at Full Gear. At Revolution in March 2022, Baker debuted a new AEW Women's World Championship belt and retained the title over Rosa. On Dynamite later that month, Baker lost the AEW Women's World Championship to Rosa in a steel cage match.

Baker participated in the 2022 Owen Hart Foundation Tournament, winning over Maki Itoh in the first round and advancing to the finals by defeating Toni Storm in the semifinal round. At Double or Nothing in May, Baker defeated Ruby Soho to become the tournament's inaugural female winner.

Professional wrestling style and persona

Baker's legitimate profession as a dentist is often referenced as part of her character in AEW, so much so that Pro Wrestling Torch observed that "it became a parody". The character was originally described as "happy", but following her heel turn, it has been described as "too proud" and "delusional". The character also began referring to herself as a "role model". Using the name Dr. Britt Baker, D.M.D. in AEW, Baker says she intentionally incorporated "Dr." and "D.M.D." despite the tautology of employing both to enhance "her character's obnoxiousness". She uses a fusion of a scissored armbar and the mandible claw, which attacks an opponent's mouth, as a finisher, named Lockjaw. She associates with Tony Schiavone, whom she calls one of her best friends, and fellow professional wrestler Rebel, who accompanies her during her matches. Baker named Bayley and Sasha Banks among her inspirations in wrestling.

Dental career
Baker is a member of the American Dental Association. In addition to working as a professional wrestler, she is employed as a dentist at a private practice in Winter Park, Florida. She said in 2018 that dentistry was her "forever dream job", adding that she intended to continue practicing alongside her wrestling career and afterwards. She stated that she has an agreement with her employing office for it to remain closed on Wednesdays to allow her to travel for Dynamite.

Personal life
Baker is in a relationship with fellow AEW professional wrestler Adam Cole.

Championships and accomplishments

All Elite Wrestling
AEW Women's World Championship (1 time)
Women’s Owen Hart Cup (2022)
Dynamite Award (1 time)
Best AEW Fashion Moment (2022) – 
DDT Pro-Wrestling
Ironman Heavymetalweight Championship (1 time)
International Wrestling Cartel
IWC Women's Championship (2 times)
Monster Factory
MFPW Girls Championship (1 time)
Pro Wrestling Illustrated
Woman of the Year (2021)
Match of the Year (2021) – vs. Thunder Rosa (March 17)
Most Improved Wrestler of the Year (2021)
Ranked No. 4 of the top 150 female wrestlers in the PWI Women's 150 in 2021
Remix Pro Wrestling
Remix Pro Fury Championship (1 time)
REW - Revolution Eastern Wrestling
REW Pakistan Championship (1 time)
Sports Illustrated
 Ranked No. 7 of the top 10 wrestlers in 2021
WrestleCircus
WC Big Top Tag Team Championship (1 time) – with Adam Cole
Wrestling Observer Newsletter
Most Improved (2020)
Zelo Pro Wrestling
Zelo Pro Women's Championship (1 time)

References

External links

1991 births
Living people
All Elite Wrestling personnel
American dentists
American female professional wrestlers
Pennsylvania State University College of Health and Human Development alumni
People from Punxsutawney, Pennsylvania
Professional wrestlers from Pennsylvania
Sportspeople from Pennsylvania
University of Pittsburgh School of Dental Medicine alumni
21st-century American women
AEW Women's World Champions
21st-century professional wrestlers
Ironman Heavymetalweight Champions